Ralph Beebe Blackman (August 29, 1904 – May 24, 1990) was an American mathematician and engineer who was among the pioneers of the information age along with Claude E. Shannon, Hendrik Wade Bode, and John Tukey.

Blackman graduated from the California Institute of Technology in 1926 and started work at Bell Laboratories the same year. His early research were in the fields of hearing, acoustics and mechanical filters. Later he focused on applied mathematics, specifically linear networks and feedback amplifiers. Starting in 1940, Blackman worked on data smoothing for anti-aircraft fire control systems.

In 1963 Blackman was elected an IEEE Fellow.

Books

Patents

See also
Blackman's theorem

References

California Institute of Technology alumni
Scientists at Bell Labs
Fellow Members of the IEEE
1904 births
1990 deaths
20th-century American engineers
American electrical engineers